The 2023 AIHL season is the 22nd season of the Australian Ice Hockey League (AIHL). The season will consist of 130 regular season games and is scheduled to run from 15 April to 13 August 2023, with the Goodall Cup finals following the regular season.

Teams
In 2023 the AIHL had 10 teams split into two conferences competing in the league.

League Business

The 2023 regular season fixture list was released publicly by the AIHL on 2 November 2022. The AIHL Finals would be altered from 2022, moving to a two weekend format for the first time in league history. League trophies would continue to be consistent with previous seasons, with the league champion awarded the historic Goodall Cup and league premier awarded the H Newman Reid Trophy. The League confirmed that the Adelaide Adrenaline and Perth Thunder would be returning to the league for 2023, after both teams pulled out of competing in 2022. The Adrenaline had secured a new venue agreement with the IceArenA, paving the way for their return. While Western Australia no longer had any border restrictions, paving the way for the Thunder's return.

Expansion

Following a successful 2022 exhibition schedule, the AIHL announced the Brisbane Lightning and Central Coast Rhinos had both been successful in obtaining full AIHL licences and would be officially joining the league and regular season for 2023. The two team expansion increased the league membership to ten teams for the first time, previously the highest membership number was nine teams in 2012.

During pre-season, there had been discussions about the possibility for the Brisbane Rampage to join the league following the collapse of the Pacific Hockey League, however the AIHL season schedule had already been organised and released publicly and season preparation had already advanced past the stage to accommodate a late addition. There was no public mention of exhibition games involving the Rampage and/or a pathway to obtaining a licence for the 2024 season.

Exhibition games

Melbourne Mustangs were the first AIHL team to announce pre-season exhibition games/events. On 4 March 2023 the Mustangs will host a delayed 10 year team anniversary reunion. The event sees a three team tournament of exhibition games played at O’Brien Icehouse. The Mustangs and Melbourne Ice organised a two game exhibition series pre-season for February and March 2023. The second game of the series would be held on Good Friday and would raise money for the Royal Children's Hospital. In early March the Brave travelled up to Brisbane to play a two game pre-season series against the Lightning. The series is to make up for the exhibition game the Brave cancelled at the end of August 2022, ahead of the AIHL Finals. The Central Coast Rhinos and Newcastle Northstars jointly announced a two-game series for the beginning of April 2023. First game to be played at Erina Ice Arena and second game at Hunter Ice Skating Centre.

Personnel changes

2023 team staff and coaching changes included:
Sydney Ice Dogs appointing a new head coach, Jason Kvisle, and associate coach, Jimmy Dufour, after letting Czech coach, Ondrej Cervenka, leave the team. Melbourne Ice had a number of ins, outs and role changes at the team. Canadian Kerry Goulet was appointed head coach. Sandy Gardner moved from head coach to assistant coach and is joined by Michael Flaherty and the rejoining Brent Laver. Keira Dunwoody joins the Ice from the Melbourne Ducks and rounds out the coaching department. In other team position changes at the Ice, Marie-Bernadette La Rose left her role as marketing manager after four years with the team, while Erin Tempest and Trevor Dickson were appointed to the roles of Director Secretariate and Director of Hockey Operations respectively. Melbourne Mustangs confirmed last season's head coach, Canadian Chris Lawrence would be returning to the team in 2023, but on the playing roster, so the Mustangs replaced Lawrence with American Pat McMahon, who had previous experience with Victorian junior teams and the Melbourne Ducks in the PHL in 2022. Brisbane Lightning's admission into the AIHL brought with it early pre-season changes at the team. Peter Holmes joined the Lightning as general manager and governor, replacing the outgoing Josh Labrie (GM) and Matthew Meyer (governor). Ash Jackson was then brought into the team in December 2022 as the new Director of Marketing, Media and Publicity. Ash has previous marketing campaign experience with the 2022 FIBA Women's Basketball World Cup and overseen projects with the AFL, FIFA and the ICC.

Player transfers

Interclub transfers

* Mid-season transfer.

Retirements

New signings

Players lost

Regular season

Fixtures and results

The 2023 regular season consists of 130 games that are scheduled to run from 15 April 2023 to 13 August 2023. For the first time since 2012, the AIHL regular season sees teams split into two conferences. Teams will play a total of 26 regular season games, playing each team in their conference four times (two at home and two away) and playing teams outside their conference twice.

April

May

June

July

August

Key:

Standings

Overall

Conference A

Conference B

Goodall Cup playoffs
The exact format for the 2023 Finals series for the AIHL has not been finalised or publicly released yet. However, the 2023 Finals will be played over two weeks for the first time in AIHL history.

References

External links
The Australian Ice Hockey League
Ice Hockey Australia

2023 in ice hockey
2023 in Australian sport
2023